The Don Juans (also known as Skirt Chasers) is a 2013 Czech comedy film directed by Jiří Menzel. The film was selected as the Czech entry for the Best Foreign Language Film at the 86th Academy Awards, but it was not nominated. Originally Agnieszka Holland's mini-series Burning Bush had been selected to represent the Czech Republic. However AMPAS disqualified the film, citing regulations that the film must not have initially appeared on television. The mini-series aired on Czech TV eight months prior to the re-edited version that appeared in cinemas. The Don Juans was a controversial pick as members of the Czech Film Academy did not see the film before it was chosen and because the film was poorly received by Czech critics.

Cast
 Jan Hartl as Vítek
 Libuše Šafránková as Markétka
 Martin Huba as Jakub
 Jiřina Jirásková as Jiřina
 Ivana Chýlková as Adélka
 Jan Jirán as Conductor
 Václav Kopta as Otto
 Eva Josefíková as young Markétka
 Václav Jílek as young Jakub

See also
 List of submissions to the 86th Academy Awards for Best Foreign Language Film
 List of Czech submissions for the Academy Award for Best Foreign Language Film

References

External links
 

2013 films
2013 comedy films
2010s Czech-language films
Films directed by Jiří Menzel
Czech comedy films